"The Chariot" is a song by The Cat Empire. It was released in May 2004 as the third single from their 2003 debut album. "The Chariot" peaked at #34 in the Australian singles chart.

A promotional DVD featuring The Chariot music video was given to members of the official 'Street Team' in 2004.

Track listing

 Tracks 2 & 3, Live at The Metro, Sydney.

 Track 4, Live at Bennetts Lane, Melbourne and Moulin Rouge, Sydney.
 Track 5, Live at The Troccadero, Surfers Paradise

Charts

References

2004 singles
2003 songs
The Cat Empire songs
Protest songs
EMI Records singles
Virgin Records singles